Dmytro Suiarko is a Ukrainian visually impaired cross-country skier and biathlete.

Career
He made his Paralympic debut for Ukraine during the 2018 Winter Paralympics. He again represented Ukraine at the 2022 Winter Paralympics and won a gold medal in the 4 × 2.5 kilometre open relay and three bronze medals in the men's 6 kilometres and 10 kilometres biathlon events and the 12.5 kilometres cross-country skiing event.

Personal life
On 7 March 2022, Suiarko's house was bombed and destroyed during the Russian invasion of Ukraine.

References 

Living people
Ukrainian male cross-country skiers
Ukrainian male biathletes
Biathletes at the 2018 Winter Paralympics
Biathletes at the 2022 Winter Paralympics
Cross-country skiers at the 2018 Winter Paralympics
Paralympic biathletes of Ukraine
Paralympic cross-country skiers of Ukraine
Paralympic gold medalists for Ukraine
Paralympic bronze medalists for Ukraine
Medalists at the 2022 Winter Paralympics
Visually impaired category Paralympic competitors
Paralympic medalists in biathlon
Paralympic medalists in cross-country skiing
Cross-country skiers at the 2022 Winter Paralympics
Year of birth missing (living people)